Jin Mi-jung (born 28 January 1978) is a Korean basketball player who competed in the 2008 Summer Olympics.

References

External links

1978 births
Living people
South Korean women's basketball players
Olympic basketball players of South Korea
Basketball players at the 2008 Summer Olympics
People from Jeonju
Sportspeople from North Jeolla Province